Langkahan is a district in North Aceh Regency, Nanggröe Aceh Darussalam, province of Indonesia.

Langkahan has several villages, namely:
 Alue Dua
 Alue Krak Kayee
 Bantayan
 Buket Linteung
 Cot Bada
 Geudumbak
 Kampung Blang
 Krueng Lingka
 Langkahan
 Leubok Mane
 Lubok Pusaka
 Matang Keutapang
 Matang Rubek
 South Matang Teungoh
 Meunasah Blang
 Padang Meuria
 Pante Gaki Bale
 Paya Tukai
 Rumoh Rayeuk
 Seureuke
 Simpang Tiga
 South Tanjong Dalam
 Tanjong Jawa

North Aceh Regency
Districts of Aceh